Keiladeva (Keiladeua, Keiladea, Keilada , ,) was a Dacian town mentioned in toponomastic inscriptions.

See also 
 Dacian davae
 List of ancient cities in Thrace and Dacia
 Dacia
 Roman Dacia

References

Ancient

Modern

Further reading 

 

Dacian towns